During the 1997–98 English football season, Coventry City competed in the FA Premier League.

Season summary
After a last-day "houdini" act and the bonus of Middlesbrough having 3 points deducted kept Coventry up in the 1996–97 season, manager Gordon Strachan was determined to avoid another season of struggle. He achieved it, and an 11th-place finish was Coventry's highest in four seasons. However, even though they only suffered 10 defeats all season (the fourth least amount, after Arsenal, Manchester United and Liverpool), they staggeringly drew 16 games which ultimately prevented them from finishing any higher. Their secure finish was helped no end by the loyalty of striker Dion Dublin, who pledged his future to the club after turning down an offer from Blackburn Rovers. Coventry were, in fact, 17th on Boxing Day 1997, but a 3–2 win over Manchester United, with no small thanks to late goals from Dublin and Darren Huckerby, appeared to kickstart a sudden surge in form as by late March, the club found themselves in 9th. Right up to the final day of the season, the Sky Blues were within a shout of a UEFA Cup place, but they were beaten to it by local rivals Aston Villa. The two places above them were occupied by two other local rivals – Derby County and Leicester City.

Final league table

Results summary

Results by round

Results
Coventry City's score comes first

Legend

FA Premier League

FA Cup

League Cup

Squad

Left club during season

Reserve squad

Transfers

In

Out

Transfers in:  £5,325,000
Transfers out:  £3,500,000
Total spending:  £1,825,000

Statistics

Starting 11
Considering starts in all competitions

Notes

References

Coventry City F.C. seasons
Coventry City